"The Shelter of Your Eyes" is a song written and recorded by American country music artist Don Williams. It was released in December 1972 as his debut single and the first from his album Don Williams Volume One. The single release would be the first commercial single released by 1970s country star Don Williams, and it would be a number twelve country chart hit.

Williams was signed to Jack Clements' J-M-I Records and Jack Music, Inc in 1972 by Allen Reynolds, and Reynolds would go on to produce Williams' entire debut album.

Many of Williams' best known songs would be written by other composers (including Bob McDill, Allen Reynolds and Al Turney) and this single release was notable in that it was one of the few of Williams' self-penned tunes to be a charting single.

The song was also recorded by the singer Lobo for his 1975 album "Just A Singer" on Big Tree Records, which was distributed by Atlantic Records.

The B-Side "Playin' Around" was re-released on several Don Williams compilation albums throughout the 2000s.

Cover versions
The song was covered by Charley Pride on his 1973 album Sweet Country.

Chart performance

References 

1973 debut singles
1973 songs
Don Williams songs
Charley Pride songs
Songs written by Don Williams
Song recordings produced by Allen Reynolds
ABC Records singles